Veritas Storage Foundation (VSF), previously known as Veritas Foundation Suite, is a computer software product made by Veritas Software that combines Veritas Volume Manager (VxVM) and Veritas File System (VxFS) to provide  online-storage management. Symantec Corporation developed and maintained VSF  until January 29, 2016, at which point Veritas and Symantec separated. The latest product version, 7.0, was re-branded as "Veritas InfoScale 7.0".

Veritas Storage Foundation provides:

 Dynamic storage tiering (DST)
 Dynamic multipathing (DMP)
 RAID support

Major releases 
Veritas Storage Foundation was also packaged in bundles such as Veritas Storage Foundation Veritas Cluster Server, for databases, for Oracle RAC, and Veritas Cluster File System.

Veritas InfoScale Enterprise 7.0, December 2015
Veritas Storage Foundation 6.0, December 2011
Veritas Storage Foundation 5.1, December 2009
Veritas Storage Foundation Basic 4.x and 5.x, February 2007, free version, impose usage limits
Veritas Storage Foundation 5.0, July 2006
Veritas Storage Foundation 4.3 (Windows-only release), August 2005
Veritas Storage Foundation 4.2 (Windows-only release), December 2004 
 Support Microsoft Multipath I/O (MPIO) (only Windows 2003)
 Includes Veritas Volume Replicator (VVR)
Veritas Storage Foundation 4.1, May 2004
Veritas Storage Foundation 4.0
Veritas Foundation Suite 3.5
Veritas Foundation Suite 3.4
Veritas Foundation Suite 2.2

Supported OS platforms included AIX, Solaris, HP-UX, Red Hat Linux, SUSE Linux and Microsoft Windows.

See also
 Veritas Volume Manager (VxVM)
 Veritas File System (VxFS)
 Symantec Operations Readiness Tools (SORT)

External links
 Late Breaking News (LBN) - Updates to the Release Notes for Veritas InfoScale 7.0 and 7.0.1
 Veritas Storage Foundation documentation
 Veritas Storage Foundation product page at Symantec
 Veritas Storage Foundation Basic product page at Symantec
 Symantec Operations Readiness Tools (SORT)

References 

Storage software